The Dangerous Preparations Directive is a European Union directive in the field of occupational safety and health and consumer protection. It complements the Dangerous Substances Directive (67/548/EEC) and replaces a previous Dangerous Preparations Directive (88/379/EEC). The European Court of Justice had ruled in 1985 that Dangerous Substances Directive (67/548/EEC) applies only to pure substances, not preparations (mixtures of substances).

References 

European Union directives
Packaging
Regulation of chemicals in the European Union
1999 in law
1999 in the European Union